Hellbilly Deluxe 2:  Noble Jackals, Penny Dreadfuls and the Systematic Dehumanization of Cool is the fourth solo studio album by former White Zombie frontman Rob Zombie. The album is a sequel to his debut album Hellbilly Deluxe. It was released on February 2, 2010, through Roadrunner Records. 
This is the first album with bassist Piggy D and the last with  drummer Tommy Clufetos.

Background
Rob Zombie had finished recording the album before the end of 2008, but the release had been delayed until November 2009 due to his commitments with Halloween II, and again until February 2010 due to a lack of promotion. According to Rob Zombie, there was not enough time to release advance copies to the press or create a music video for the first single, "What?," before their tour. Though originally intended to be released through Geffen Records, Zombie's record label of 18 years starting with White Zombie, the album was released through Roadrunner Records/Loud & Proud Records.

Hellbilly Deluxe 2 is also the first release where Rob Zombie worked with his full touring band. Previous albums were written and recorded by Rob Zombie himself and a rotating set of musicians. Commenting on the change, Zombie stated, "I've always had a revolving roster of studio and touring musicians, but the three guys in my band now have been on tour with me for years. So we're making it as a band. It's called Rob Zombie, but we're treating it like a band."

Rob Zombie enlisted the help of artists Dan Brereton (creator of Nocturnals), Alex Horley (of Image Comics and DC Comics) and David Hartman (storyboard artist) to create the album artwork. British dark/horror/science fiction/steampunk artist Sam Shearon aka 'Mister Sam Shearon' (artwork for Godhead, Ministry, Slayer, IDW Publishing, Clive Barker, and tour merchandise for Iron Maiden and HIM) also contributed to the artwork of Hellbilly Deluxe 2.

Rob Zombie began touring in support of the new album shortly before its release date. The first leg of the Hellbilly Deluxe 2 World Tour featured Nekromantix and Captain Clegg & The Night Creatures, the fictional band from Halloween II. Uncle Seymour Coffins, also from Halloween II, hosted the Los Angeles show on Halloween night.

The song "What?", the first single from the album, starting playing on radio stations October 6 and was released on iTunes October 13. Another new song, "Burn", was released on Rock Band on October 27 as part of a triple pack which also includes the hits "Dragula" and "Superbeast". "Burn" was later released as a free download on December 17, 2009, via the band's website.

Reissue
Tommy Clufetos, the drummer on the studio recordings for Hellbilly Deluxe 2, left the band in early 2010 to play drums for Ozzy Osbourne on the album Scream. Clufetos was replaced by Murderdolls guitarist and Slipknot drummer Joey Jordison initially as a touring member. Before joining the 2010 Mayhem Festival, Jordison joined Zombie, John 5 and Piggy D. to record some new songs. These tracks were described by Zombie as "some of the fastest and heaviest tracks we have recorded in a long, long time." John Tempesta, former member of White Zombie and drummer on Zombie's early solo albums, was going to be featured on a song called "Loving the Freaks" during these sessions, and Rob Zombie confirmed that working with Tempesta was planned but never took place due to schedule conflicts.

The three new tracks recorded with this lineup, "Devil's Hole Girls and the Big Revolution," "Michael" and "Everything Is Boring," were released as bonus tracks on the reissue of Hellbilly Deluxe 2 as tracks 1, 14 and 8 respectively. The updated version was released on September 28, 2010, through Roadrunner Records. Along with new artwork, the reissue also contains a new version of "The Man Who Laughs", most notably replacing the original drum solo with a mandolin solo instead and is about two minutes shorter than the original. The intro to "Mars Needs Women" has been separated into the track "Theme for an Angry Red Planet".  Also included is a bonus DVD containing a 30-minute tour documentary titled "Transylvanian Transmissions."

Reception

Hellbilly Deluxe 2 received generally positive reviews from critics. On Metacritic, the album earned a score of 63/100 based on ten reviews. The album debuted at No. 8 on the Billboard 200 chart, selling 49,000 copies in its first week of release.

Track listing

Original version

Reissue

Personnel 
 Rob Zombie – vocals, lyrics, producer, photography, art direction, package design
 John 5 – guitars
 Piggy D. – bass
 Tommy Clufetos – drums
 Joey Jordison – drums on tracks 1, 8, 14 (for reissue)
 Tyler Bates – string arrangements
 Chris Baseford – keyboards and programming, recording, mixing
 The Chop Shop, Hollywood, California – recording and mixing location
 Tom Baker – mastering
 Dan Brereton – artwork
 Alex Horley – artwork
 David Hartman – artwork
 Sam Shearon – artwork
 Piggy D. – photography, including cover
 Wayne Toth – makeup, photography
 Bart Mixon – makeup

Charts

References

External links
Rob Zombie official website

Rob Zombie albums
2010 albums
Roadrunner Records albums
Albums produced by Rob Zombie
Albums produced by Scott Humphrey
Sequel albums